Song Bo-bae (born 22 February 1986) is a South Korean professional golfer who plays on the LPGA of Japan Tour and LPGA of Korea Tour.

Song has won several times on the LPGA of Korea Tour and LPGA of Japan Tour including the 2005 Samsung Ladies Masters co-sanctioned by the Ladies European Tour and the 2009 Mizuno Classic co-sanctioned by the LPGA Tour.

Professional wins

LPGA of Korea Tour (6) 
2003 (1) Korea Women's Open (as an amateur)
2004 (2) Korea Women's Open, SK EnClean Invitational
2005 (2) Samsung Ladies Masters (co-sanctioned with Ladies European Tour), Pyongyang Women's Open
2006 (1) Lakeside Ladies Open

LPGA of Japan Tour (3)
2008 (1) Daikin Orchid Ladies Golf Tournament
2009 (2) Japan Women's Open, Mizuno Classic (co-sanctioned with LPGA Tour)

LPGA Tour (1)

Ladies European Tour (1)
2005 (1) Samsung Ladies Masters (co-sanctioned with LPGA of Korea Tour)

Team appearances
Professional
World Cup (representing South Korea): 2005, 2006

References

External links

Profile on Seoul Sisters site

South Korean female golfers
LPGA of Korea Tour golfers
LPGA of Japan Tour golfers
Sportspeople from Jeju Province
1986 births
Living people